Mount Guardian is a mountain located in the Catskill Mountains of New York northeast of Wittenberg. Overlook Mountain is located northeast, and Ohayo Mountain is located south of Mount Guardian.

References

Guardian
Guardian